Redemption Process  is the fourth album by the French symphonic black metal band Anorexia Nervosa. This album saw a change in lyrical content from lyrics dealing with violence and depression to redemption.

Track listing
 "The Shining"
 "Antinferno"
 "Sister September"
 "Worship Manifesto"
 "Codex-Veritas"
 "An Amen"
 "The Sacrament"
 "Les Tzars" [European bonus] [ Indochine cover]
 "Stabat Mater Dolorosa" [Japanese bonus] [2004 version]
 "I'll Kill You" [Japanese bonus] [ X Japan cover]
 "Sister September" [Korean bonus] [Demo version]
 "Codex-Veritas" [Korean bonus] [Demo version]

Charts

References

Anorexia Nervosa (band) albums
2004 albums